The Pangkajene is a river of south-western Sulawesi, north of Makassar, Indonesia, about 1400 km northeast of capital Jakarta.

Hydrology 
Upstream, the stretch of river is known as the Koraja River. The rock of the river is Jurassic Paremba Sandstone and contains many shallow marine sedimentary rocks and crystalline schists. The fossilized remains of plants have been discovered in the Pangkajene area.

Geography 
The river flows in the southwestern area of Sulawesi island with predominantly tropical rainforest climate (designated as Af in the Köppen-Geiger climate classification). The annual average temperature in the area is 25 °C. The warmest month is September, when the average temperature is around 28 °C, and the coldest is January, at 21 °C. The average annual rainfall is 2570 mm. The wettest month is January, with an average of 480 mm rainfall, and the driest is September, with 33 mm rainfall.

Gallery

See also
List of rivers of Indonesia
List of rivers of Sulawesi

References

Rivers of South Sulawesi
Rivers of Indonesia